Verehrt und angespien ("Worshipped and Spat Upon") is the second medieval folk metal album by the German band In Extremo. It was released in 1999 by Mercury Records.

Track listing 
 "Merseburger Zaubersprüche" (Unknown author, 10th century/In Extremo) – 4:27
 "Ich kenne alles (I Know Everything)" (François Villon/In Extremo) – 3:04
 "Herr Mannelig" (Traditional lyrics and music) – 4:55
 "Pavane" (Traditional lyrics/In Extremo) – 5:00
 "Spielmannsfluch (The Gleeman's Bane)" (Ludwig Uhland/In Extremo) – 3:40
 "Weiberfell" (François Villon/In Extremo) – 4:27
 "Miss Gordon of Gight" (In Extremo) – 2:09
 "Werd ich am Galgen hochgezogen (When I Am Hoisted on the Gallows)" (François Villon/In Extremo) – 3:47
 "This Corrosion" (The Sisters of Mercy cover) – 4:02
 "Santa Maria" (Traditional lyrics and music/In Extremo) – 4:27
 "" (Traditional lyrics and music) – 3:57
 "In Extremo" (In Extremo) – 4:26

Bonus track:
 "Herr Mannelig" (Acoustic Version) – 3:08

Personnel 
 Das letzte Einhorn – vocals, harp, cittern
 Thomas der Münzer – guitar
 Die Lutter – bass, marine trumpet
 Der Morgenstern – drums, percussion, timpani
 Dr. Pymonte – German bagpipes, shawm, flute, harp
 Flex der Biegsame – German bagpipes, shawm, flute
 Yellow Pfeiffer – German bagpipes, shawm, flute, nyckelharpa

References 

1999 albums
In Extremo albums
Mercury Records albums
Metal Blade Records albums
Vertigo Records albums